Rádio Santos is a Paulista radio network operated by Santos FC on its official website. Match commentaries is  available on Rádio Santos for all first team games, including friendlies. In order to gain as wide an audience as possible, broadcasts are in two languages: Portuguese and English.

References
General

 
Specific

External links
Rádio Santos

Portuguese-language radio stations
Santos FC
2010 establishments in Brazil